The Coșuștea Mică is a right tributary of the river Coșuștea in Romania. It flows into the Coșuștea in Ciovârnășani.

References

Rivers of Romania
Rivers of Mehedinți County